Alfonso Almeida Saenz (born 12 October 1966) is a chess International Master from Mexico. On the July 2009 FIDE rating list he had an Elo rating of 2,378, making him the number nine Mexican chess player. His peak rating was 2,429 in April 2007 (2,440 in 1996). In the 2015 season of the US Chess League, he had 7 MVP points and a 2,735 performance rating.

Almeida was Mexican Open Champion in 1991 and Mexican Absolute Champion in 1998–1999. He tied for second place at the U.S. Open 2006 in Chicago. In 2004, he was a Mexican Team member at the 36th Chess Olympiad in Calvia, Spain. 

Titles
FIDE International Master 1996
FIDE Trainer 2007

Degrees
BBA-Management (University of Texas-Brownsville)
M.Ed. educational technology (University of Texas-Brownsville)
E.Ed. (candidate) instructional and educational technology (Texas Tech University)

References

External links
 
 
 Player profiles at ChessClub.com

Living people
Mexican chess players
Chess International Masters
1966 births